The 2011–12 ISU Speed Skating World Cup, officially the Essent ISU World Cup Speed Skating 2011–2012, was a series of international speed skating competitions which ran the entire season. The season started on 18 November 2011 in Chelyabinsk, Russia, and ended on 11 March 2012 in Berlin, Germany. In total, seven competition weekends were held at six different locations, twelve cups were contested (six for men, and six for women), and 72 races took place.

The mass start was introduced as a new event for the season. Additionally, the team sprint was contested as a demonstration event at both Heerenveen competitions. The World Cup is organized by the International Skating Union (ISU).

Calendar 

Note: the men's 5000 and 10000 metres were contested as one cup, and the women's 3000 and 5000 metres were contested as one cup, as indicated by the color coding.

Source: ISU.

World records

World records going into the 2011–12 season.

Men

Women

Men's standings

500 m

1000 m

1500 m

5000 and 10000 m

Mass start

Team pursuit

Women's standings

500 m

1000 m

1500 m

3000 and 5000 m

Mass start

Team pursuit

See also
2012 World Allround Speed Skating Championships
2012 World Sprint Speed Skating Championships
2012 World Single Distance Speed Skating Championships

References

External links 
International Skating Union
2011–12 ISU Speed Skating World Cup
Results at ISUresults.eu
Results of WC1 Chelyabinsk ISUresults.eu
Results of WC2 Astana ISUresults.eu
Results of WC3 Heerenveen ISUresults.eu
Results of WC4 Salt Lake City ISUresults.eu
Results of WC5 Hamar ISUresults.eu

 
11-12
Isu Speed Skating World Cup, 2011-12
Isu Speed Skating World Cup, 2011-12